The National Day Parade, officially the National Day of the People's Republic of China Parade, is a civil-military parade event held at Tiananmen Square in Beijing, the capital of the People's Republic of China, on the National Day of the People's Republic of China on 1 October. It is organized by the People's Liberation Army, the People's Armed Police and the Militia, as well as civilian groups of the Chinese Communist Party (CCP). It has been held every decade since 1959, annually from 1950 to 1959, and has been broadcast live on China Central Television since 1984.

The most recent National Day parade took place on October 1, 2019, on the 70th anniversary of the People's Republic of China.

Overview

Since the parade of 1950, parades have been held on the city's Tiananmen Square to mark the anniversary of the official foundation of the PRC and today these have been held every 10th year (a format which began in 1999 to mark the golden jubilee anniversary of nationhood), formerly there were yearly parades held until 1959 when the CCP decided that the holiday would be celebrated "with frugality". Parades were also held in 1964, 1966, 1969, 1970 and 1984.

The parade is presided by the paramount leader in his political duty as General Secretary of the Chinese Communist Party and constitutional mandate as the supreme commander of the PLA and chairman of the Central Military Commission, since 1984. He has also inspected the parade in person. The parade commander is a general officer of the PLA with the rank of Lieutenant General or Major General, with the position of commander of the Central Theater Command or as a high-ranking member of the CMC's present 15 departments. Until 1959, during the years that the parade was held in a nationalized form of the Soviet tradition, the parade was inspected by the Minister of National Defense, a high-ranking billet occupied by either a General or (before 1984) a Marshal (before 1954 the Commander in Chief of the PLA). The event's master of ceremonies has either been the Party Committee Secretary of Beijing or a high-ranking member of the Central Committee, CCP.

Parade events

Opening of the parade
At 10 a.m. the massed military bands of the People's Liberation Army sound the Welcome March, signifying the official commencement of the ceremony. As the paramount leader arrives, he is joined by the following on the rostrum on the Tiananmen Gate:

 Premier of the State Council of the PRC
 Chairmen of both the Standing Committees of the National People's Congress and the Chinese People's Political Consultative Conference
 High-ranking officials of the Politburo Standing Committee and the other departments under the Central Committee, CCP
 Vice President of the PRC
 Vice Premiers of the State Council of the PRC 
 Vice Chairmen of the Central Military Commission and members of the departments of the Commission
 Chief Justice of the Supreme People's Court
 Prosecutor General of the Supreme People's Procuratorate
 State Councilors
 Vice Chairmen of the Standing Committee of the NPC and the National Committee of the CPPCC
 Secretaries of the Secretariat of the Chinese Communist Party
 Retired leaders of the party and the Republic 
 Representatives of both the NPC and CPPCC, including party faction leaders and leaders of CPPCC organizational factions
 Ministers of the State Council and heads of national government agencies with ministerial status
 Members of the diplomatic corps and any foreign heads of state and/or governments present if any
 Representatives of the private sector, state-owned national and regional companies and people's organizations
 If available, provincial governors, city mayors and heads of the Party provincial and municipal committees and regional-level legislatures

In past parades a card stunt display was assembled at the square grounds made up of thousands of young men and women from the capital and from various parts of the country (abolished 2015), while student battalions of the Young Pioneers of China are assembled in the sides of the Massed Bands, led by the Senior Director of Music of the PLA Military Bands Service, made up of around 1,900 male and female bandsmen from the service branches from military bands stationed nationwide. The Pioneer Battalions carry the red battalion colours which can be seen in front of their respective contingents.

The flag raising ceremony follows the arrivals, but unlike the normal ceremony the color guard company, as a 21-gun salute is fired by the gunners of the State Honors Artillery Battery of the Beijing Garrison Command, marches off from the sides of the Monument to the People's Heroes, forms up, and takes its place at the center of the grounds nearest the Massed Bands, with the Flag of China now being placed into the flagpole by the color officer, who has just been given the color from the color guard. The segment was introduced in 1999 as a reenactment of sorts of the raising of the national flag in the square in 1949.

With that concluded and the card stunt now in position, the master of ceremonies gives the announcement on the microphone: Ladies and gentlemen, please stand for the raising of the national flag and the singing of the National Anthem! By then, the color officer now orders the salute and the massed bands play the National Anthem March of the Volunteers as the color company presents arms, after the anthem is played the color company orders arms and stands at ease.

Inspection of the parade
As the armed linemen of the Beijing Capital Garrison take their places, the paramount leader then descends to the grounds of the Tiananmen Gate via the elevator and rides on an open top Hongqi L5 for the inspection segment, with around 4,000 to 16,000 military personnel of the PLA, PAP and militia formations assembled by battalions, as well as the 9,000 strong personnel of the mobile column with around 400-900 vehicles. As he arrives at the front of the gate at the Chang'an Avenue, the parade commander (since 1954 the Commander of the Beijing Military Region and later the Central Theater Command) arrives in a similar limousine to inform the paramount leader of the commencement of the inspection of the parade.

The report done, the paramount leader, as the Massed bands play, then inspects the formations, each of its leaders ordering a salute as he passes by and the battalions each present arms (eyes right for unarmed formations and the port arms when using modern rifles), after which they stand at attention. Since 1984 the regular honor guard companies of the Beijing Garrison Honor Guard Battalion (since 2015 the final company is a women's company) together with its national colour guard unit are the first in line for the inspection segment of the parade.

Whenever the paramount leader passes by an assembled militia or battalion, the soldiers will salute, and the paramount leader will greet the soldiers by saying "Hello, comrades!" (同志们好!) or "[Thank you for your] hard work, comrades!" (同志们辛苦了!) The soldiers respond saying "Hello, Mr. Chairman!" (主席好!) or "[We] serve the people!" (为人民服务!)

Following the inspection, the paramount leader returns to the Tiananmen Gate to give the national keynote holiday address, at the same time the commander takes his place in the gate as well and the parade formations are now formed in review order as the mobile column now forms up in addition to the flypast.

In the 2019 parade, the order was reversed, this time the paramount leader gives the opening keynote address before departing from the gate for the parade inspection.

Military parade proper
The order Commence the parade! from the parade commander atop Tiananmen Gate is the signal for the parade formation to march past the gate, wherein the dignitaries are gathered, while the crowds are assembled on the stands around the gate which include veterans of the PLA, Young Pioneers, representatives of state and private businesses and distinguished citizens as well as the civil service and the diplomatic corps and foreign press representatives. As the Massed Bands play the Parade March of the PLA, a special parade version of the Military Anthem of the People's Liberation Army, following the fly past of the national and party flags and the flag of the PLA, alongside, in special years, a helicopter formation honoring the number of years of nationhood, the ground column marches first as the General Secretary and other party, state and military leaders take the salute of each of the contingents marching past the saluting stand. Since 1984 the regular honor guard companies of the Beijing Garrison Honor Guard Battalion, including the aforementioned female company, are the first to march past the dignitaries, led by the colour guard carrying the flag of the PLA, which serves as the de facto national colour, alongside the national and party flags that both precede it. Each of the battalions that march past are made up of the following:

 Officers of the CMC, MND and the People's Armed Police
 National Defense University
 Military academies and officer cadet schools
 PLA Ground Forces
 PLA Navy
 PLA Marine Corps
 PLA Air Force
 PLA Airborne Corps
 PLA Special Operations Forces
 PLA Rocket Forces
 Joint Logistics Support Force
 Women's contingent of PLA personnel
 People's Armed Police
 PLA Reserve Service Forces
 China Militia of the CMC and NDMC
 Civilian workers of the CMC, PLA and MND
 Battalion of PLA personnel serving in UN peacekeeping operations

Until the parade of 1959, the PLA, PAP and militia marched separately during the parade proper (the militia marched as part of the civil column). Each of the battalions consists of 350 soldiers (14 rows of 25 soldiers) and are led by the battalion commander and the battalion political commissar, who march at the lead of their unit.

A mobile column then follows which is also formed into battalions, but with the command personnel mounted on their vehicles as they render honors. These are made up of the mostly nationally produced military vehicles and equipment in service and being introduced to serve the needs of the modern PLA. A notable unit to serve in the mobile column is the female contingent from the Bethune Medical College, which was introduced to the parade in 1984. Following this column, the flypast of aircraft from the Ground Forces, Navy and Air Force follows suit.

List of National Day parades
The following parades have been held since 1949:

Cancelled parades 
1969 – Pushed through at last minute, but no mobile column and flypast, only civil-military parade column
1971 – Due to the Lin Biao Incident
1979 – Due to the aftermath of the Cultural Revolution
1989 – Due to the 1989 Tiananmen Square protests

Gallery

See also
October Revolution Day
Victory Day Parades
Pakistan Day Parade
Mongolian State Flag Day
Indonesian National Armed Forces Day

Notes

References

External links

The National Day Parade Official Website (2009 version)
Parts 1 2 3 and 4 of a documentary on the history of the Chinese National Day Parade]
 Fifteen military units march in formation for National Day parade
 《庆祝中华人民共和国成立70周年大会 阅兵式 群众游行特别报道》 20191001 | CCTV
 720P High Definition Video of the 60th Anniversary Parade – (YouTube) (720p resolution in HD mode)
 Documentary Film: China's 50th National Day Military Parade 1999 PLA August First Film Stu
 1984 China Military Parade Full Version | 1984年中国人民解放军大阅兵
 1984 北京35週年國慶閱兵、羣衆遊行 （粵語旁述完整版
 1959 CHINA NATIONAL DAY 《庆祝建国十周年》

People's Republic of China
Annual events in Beijing
Military of China
Military parades in China
Autumn events in China
Recurring events established in 1949
1949 establishments in China